The Nanyangdong (Nanyang East) railway station is a railway station for high-speed trains in Nanyang, Henan, China. It was opened on December 1, 2019 with the Zhengzhou to Xiangyang section of Zhengzhou–Wanzhou high-speed railway.

Station layout 
The station looks like a soaring dragon. The gross floor area is 50,680 square meters, which makes Nanyangdong the largest trackside station in China. Inside the station, Zhuge Liang's Chu Shi Biao (出师表) and Li Bai's Nan Du Xing (南都行) were carved on the wall.

Services 
As of June 20, 2022, Nanyangdong railway station handles around 100 trains daily, 37 of which originate/terminate here.

See also
 Nanyang railway station

References 

Railway stations in Henan
Railway stations in China opened in 2019